Doris Bloom (born 1954 in Vereeniging, South Africa) is a South African painter who also incorporates performance art into her work. She lives and works in Denmark.

Biography

During 1972, Bloom attended Johannesburg College of Art and later attended Royal Danish Academy of Fine Arts in 1976. She has receive Queen Ingrid's Great Roman Grant, Villiam H. Michaelsen's Grant, and The State Art Council's Grant . Doris Bloom is Jewish.

Career

Bloom has showcased exhibitions since 1977. For exhibitions she is known for doing solo acts as well as collaborations. Bloom is also known for performances during exhibitions, many of them involve her doing a performance in front of a finished work, but some also include her creating the artwork in front of viewers. Bloom uses many different mediums for her work; oil, watercolor, crayon, and mixed media.

Works
 Composition, 1985
 Tyrants of tolerance 1, 1991
 Candles in the wind 1, 1995
 Oval office 2, 1991-1998
 Three Compositions, 2003

Exhibitions
 Albertslund Municipality, Denmark (mural) 1977
 Franz Pedersens Kunthandel, Denmark (solo) 1985
 Studio E, Rome (solo) 1986
 Gallery 11, DR TV (performance), 1991
 9th International Cairo Biennale, Egypt 2003
 YAM-ADAM-DAM-ADAMA, Gammelgaard, Denmark (solo) 2010

References

"Doris Bloom." Doris Bloom Biography – Doris Bloom on artnet . N.p., n.d. Web. 11 Mar. 2017.
"Bloom, Doris." The-artists.org . N.p., n.d. Web. 11 Mar. 2017.
"Visual arts dialogue ." YouTube . Ed. BvHHS HHS. YouTube, 26 Nov. 2014. Web. 11 Mar. 2017.
Wamberg, Jacob, and Doris Bloom. The labyrinthine nest: the art of Doris Bloom. Bramley, Johannesburg: Taurus, 1991. Print.

1954 births
Living people
20th-century South African women artists
21st-century South African women artists
People from Vereeniging
Royal Danish Academy of Fine Arts alumni